Darris Kilgour is a former professional lacrosse player and coach. Kilgour currently is the head coach of the Seneca WarChiefs (FNJBLL). He is from the Tuscarora Indian Reservation near Lewiston New York.

Player 
Kilgour played for the Buffalo Bandits of the National Lacrosse League for eight seasons, before finishing his playing career with the Rochester Knighthawks and Albany Attack. As a player, he won three championships with the Bandits, and is the all-time team leader in penalty minutes and faceoffs. Kilgour's number '43' was retired by the Bandits in March 2001, making him the first player to have his number retired by an NLL team. He was inducted into the National Lacrosse League Hall of Fame in 2007.

In 1994, as a member of the Six Nations Chiefs, Kilgour was awarded the Mike Kelly Memorial Trophy as most valuable player in the Mann Cup competition.

Coach 
Kilgour became head coach of the Washington Power for the 2001 season. He led the Power to the playoffs in each of his two seasons as coach before returning to Buffalo as their head coach after the 2002 season. The Bandits posted a 12-4 record in 2003, and Kilgour was awarded the NLL Coach of the Year Award (later renamed to the Les Bartley Award). The next year, after a mediocre 8-8 regular season, the Bandits caught fire in the postseason, making it to the Championship game for the first time since 1997, but lost the championship game to the Calgary Roughnecks losing 14-11. In 2005 the Bandits would again make it to the Champion's Cup final, this time falling short against Colorado Mammoth 16-9.

Following the 2012 season, Kilgour was fired from his post as general manager of the Bandits, but continued to hold the position of head coach. A season later on June 10, 2013, the Bandits Director of Lacrosse Operations, Scott Loffler, informed Kilgour that he would not be retained as coach for the 2014 season.

Kilgour has more wins than any other coach in NLL history, surpassing Les Bartley's 93 wins on March 12, 2010 with the Buffalo Bandits defeating the Toronto Rock 11-10 in overtime at Toronto's Air Canada Centre.

Shortly after leaving the Buffalo Bandits Kilgour was hired as head coach of the Seneca WarChiefs, a Junior B box lacrosse team who compete in the First Nations Junior B Lacrosse League.

Player statistics

Arrests
Kilgour was arrested on May 9, 2011 for drunk driving after the police found his car in a ditch in the Town of Lewiston. There were additional charges of unsafe backing, unlicensed operation of a motor vehicle, and refusal to take a breath test. In 2013, Kilgour got his second DWI arrest in Lewiston after being pulled over at 3:00 AM. He was also charged with speeding and operating a vehicle without insurance or a registration. Then, in 2014 he was arrested for second degree harassment, menacing and endangering a child after dropping his son of at his estranged wife’s house drunk. Once he reached the house, he reportedly approached the house with a hammer and shoved his estranged wife to the ground and harassed her boyfriend.

Car accident
On September 2, 2018, Kilgour was the victim of a hit and run where he broke both tibias, his femur and dislocated a knee. He had to have a metal rod inserted into his femur. The man who ran him over accepted a plea deal for first-degree reckless endangerment and had a blood alcohol content of 0.18 at the time of the accident.

Awards

References

External links 
 Seneca WarChiefs website

National Lacrosse League coaches
Buffalo Bandits players
Rochester Knighthawks players
Iroquois nations lacrosse players
Living people
National Lacrosse League major award winners
First Nations sportspeople
Buffalo Bandits coaches
Year of birth missing (living people)